"Walk on the Wild Side" is a song by Lou Reed from his second solo album, Transformer (1972). It was produced by David Bowie and Mick Ronson and released as a double A-side with "Perfect Day". Known as a counterculture anthem, the song received wide radio coverage and became Reed's biggest hit and signature song while touching on topics considered taboo at the time, such as transgender people, drugs, male prostitution, and oral sex.

The song's lyrics, describing a series of individuals and their journeys to New York City, refer to several of the regular "superstars" at Andy Warhol's New York studio, the Factory; the song mentions Holly Woodlawn, Candy Darling, Joe Dallesandro, Jackie Curtis and Joe Campbell (referred to in the song by the nickname "Sugar Plum Fairy").

In 2013, The New York Times described "Walk on the Wild Side" as a "ballad of misfits and oddballs" that "became an unlikely cultural anthem, a siren song luring generations of people...to a New York so long forgotten as to seem imaginary". In 2010, Rolling Stone ranked "Walk on the Wild Side" at number 223 in its list of the 500 greatest songs of all time.

Inspiration

In the 2001 documentary Classic Albums: Lou Reed: Transformer, Reed says that it was Nelson Algren's 1956 novel, A Walk on the Wild Side (itself titled after the 1952 song "The Wild Side of Life"), that was the launching point for the song, even though, as it grew, the song became inhabited by characters from his own life. As with several other Reed songs from the 1970s, the title may also be an allusion to an earlier song, in this case Mack David and Elmer Bernstein's "Walk on the Wild Side", the Academy Award-nominated title song performed by Brook Benton for the 1962 film based on Algren's novel. During his performance of the song on his 1978 Live: Take No Prisoners album, Reed humorously explains the song's development from a request that he write the music for the never-completed musical version of Algren's novel.

Each verse refers to one of the "superstars" at Andy Warhol's New York studio, The Factory.
"Holly" is based on Holly Woodlawn, a transgender actress who lived in Miami Beach, Florida as a child. In 1962, after being bullied by homophobes, the fifteen-year-old ran away from home; and, as in the lyrics, learned how to pluck her eyebrows while hitchhiking to New York.
 "Candy" is based on Candy Darling, a transgender actress and the subject of an earlier song by Lou Reed, "Candy Says". She grew up on Long Island ("the island") and was a regular at "the back room" of Max's Kansas City.
 "Little Joe" was the nickname of Joe Dallesandro, an actor who starred in Flesh, a 1968 film about a teenage hustler. Dallesandro said in 2014 that he had not yet met Reed when the song was written, and that the lyrics were based on the film character, not himself personally. However, when Reed performed "Walk on the Wild Side" in 1978 at The Bottom Line in New York City (when and where "Take No Prisoners" was recorded), he explained, "Little Joe was an idiot...You talk to him for like two minutes and you realize he has an IQ of like 12."
 "Sugar Plum Fairy" has been described as a reference to actor Joe Campbell, who played a character by that name in Warhol's 1965 film, My Hustler. The term was a euphemism for "drug dealer". Prior to joining the Warhol crowd, Campbell was Harvey Milk's boyfriend/partner for approximately six years.
 "Jackie" is based on Jackie Curtis, another Warhol actress. "Speeding" and "crashing" are drug references. Curtis at one time hoped to play the role of James Dean in a movie; Dean was killed in a car crash.

Musicians and musical elements
Like many of Reed's songs, "Walk on the Wild Side" is based on a simple chord progression alternating between C major and F major, or I and IV in harmonic analysis. The pre-chorus introduces the II chord (D major).

The baritone saxophone solo played over the fadeout of the song is performed by Ronnie Ross, who had taught David Bowie to play the saxophone during Bowie's childhood. The backing vocals are sung by Thunderthighs, a vocal group that included Dari Lalou, Karen Friedman, and Casey Synge. Drums were played by Ritchie Dharma using brushes rather than drumsticks. David Bowie plays acoustic guitar on the track.

The song is noted for its twinned ascending and descending portamento basslines played by Herbie Flowers. In an interview on BBC Radio 4 (Playing Second Fiddle, aired July 2005), Flowers claimed the reason he came up with the twin bass lines was that as a session musician, he would be paid double for playing two instruments on the same track. Flowers's bass hook was performed on double bass overlaid by fretless  Fender Jazz Bass. He was paid a £17 flat fee.

Reception

The lyrics of "Walk on the Wild Side" were groundbreaking and risqué for their time, telling stories not usually told in rock songs up to then and containing references to prostitution, transgender people, and oral sex. "I always thought it would be kinda fun to introduce people to characters they maybe hadn't met before, or hadn't wanted to meet," Reed said. "Walk on the Wild Side" became a worldwide hit. The single peaked at #16 on the Billboard Hot 100 singles charts in early 1973.

The term "colored girls" was an issue in the US. RCA in 1972 provided radio stations with a version without the reference to oral sex, and changing the line "colored girls" to "and the girls". However, most radio stations continued to play the original, uncensored version. In the UK, the oral sex reference slipped past the censors, who in 1972–73 were apparently unfamiliar with the term "giving head".

In 2010, Rolling Stone magazine ranked it as the 223rd greatest song of all time. After the announcement of Reed's death in October 2013, both the song and the Transformer album re-charted via iTunes.

Charts and certifications

Weekly charts

Year-end charts

Certifications

Cover versions
In 1990, English musician Jamie J. Morgan released his version of "Walk on the Wild Side". It peaked at number 27 on the UK Singles Chart, number 25 in Australia, and was a number one hit in New Zealand.

Also in 1990, British dance act Beat System's cover of the song reached number 63 on the UK Singles Chart.

In 1991, American group Marky Mark and the Funky Bunch, fronted by actor/musician Mark Wahlberg released the single "Wildside", which heavily samples and is stylistically similar to Reed's original version. The song reached No. 10 on the Billboard Hot 100, and No. 8 on the Billboard Hot Rap Singles chart.

See also
 Can I Kick It?, a 1990 A Tribe Called Quest single that features a prominent sample of the song.

References

Further reading

External links
 Lyrics of this song
 

1972 songs
1972 singles
Lou Reed songs
Songs about New York City
Songs written by Lou Reed
Songs about drugs
Songs based on actual events
Song recordings produced by David Bowie
1990 singles
Number-one singles in New Zealand
Transgender-related songs
Songs about prostitutes
RCA Records singles
Glam rock songs
LGBT-related songs